Dennis Mojen (born 1993 in Hamburg) is a German actor.

Career
His parents are active in the film industry. In 2010, Mojen graduated from an Acting Master Class in Los Angeles. In 2011, he played the gunman Tom in Der Ausflug. In 2015, Mojen received the New Faces Award for his role as Tommy in Tatort: Der Himmel ist ein Platz auf Erden.

In 2020, he starred as aspiring boxer Ossi in the Netflix romantic comedy film Isi & Ossi.

Partial filmography

Films 
 2009: 
 2010: The Poll Diaries
 2016: Nirgendwo
 2016: UFO: It Is Here
 2019: Traumfabrik

Short films 
 2013: Am Ende Licht
 2014: Der Ausflug

TV films 
 2011: Isenhart – Die Jagd nach dem Seelenfänger
 2011: Anna Erbe
 2013: Arnes Nachlass
 2015: Tatort: Der Himmel ist ein Platz auf Erden
 2015: Die Neue
 2016: Fanny und die gestohlene Frau
 2016: Fanny und die geheimen Väter
 2017: Brüder
 2018: Nord bei Nordwest – Waidmannsheil (TV series)
 2018: Wach
 2018: Polizeiruf 110: Crash
 2018: Extraklasse
 2019: Lotta & der schöne Schein
 2019: Träume – Der Usedom-Krimi
 2019 Traumfabrik
 2020: Isi & Ossi (Netflix film)

TV series 
 2009: Die Pfefferkörner (Episode: Kirchenklau)
 2011: Notruf Hafenkante (Episode: Alles Einstein)
 2011: Großstadtrevier (Episode: Frohe Weihnachten, Dirk Matthies)
 2012: Der Dicke (Episode: Späte Reue)
 2012: Der Cop und der Snob (Episode: Die Clique)
 2013: Heiter bis tödlich: Morden im Norden (Episode: Der Fingerzeig)
 2013: Der Lehrer (2 episodes)
 2014: Der Bergdoktor (Episode: Königskinder)
 2014: Die Chefin (Episode: Tod eines Lehrers)
 2014: In aller Freundschaft (Episode: Der Moment der Wahrheit)
 2015: Unter Gaunern (Episode: Die nackte Paula)
 2015: Großstadtrevier (Episode: Kameraden)
 2016: Morgen hör ich auf (5 episodes)
 2016: Cologne P.D. (Episode: Mörderisches Wochenende)
 2017: Leipzig Homicide (Episode: Aus der Deckung)
 2017: Alarm für Cobra 11 – Die Autobahnpolizei (Episode: Freier Fall)
 2018: SOKO München (Episode: Machtlos)
 2018: Letzte Spur Berlin (Episode: Lebensretterin)
2021: Into the Night Season 2 (Netflix)

References

External links
 

1993 births
Living people
German male television actors
21st-century German male actors
Male actors from Hamburg
Date of birth missing (living people)